Neil Day (born 1965) is a male retired British sport shooter.

Sport shooting career
He represented England and won a silver medal in the 50 metres rifle prone (pair) with Philip Scanlan, at the 1998 Commonwealth Games in Kuala Lumpur, Malaysia. Four years later he won a gold medal in the same event at the 2002 Commonwealth Games with Michael Babb.

References

1965 births
Living people
British male sport shooters
Commonwealth Games medallists in shooting
Commonwealth Games gold medallists for England
Commonwealth Games silver medallists for England
Shooters at the 1998 Commonwealth Games
Shooters at the 2002 Commonwealth Games
Medallists at the 1998 Commonwealth Games
Medallists at the 2002 Commonwealth Games